"Can't Put It in the Hands of Fate" is a song by American singer-songwriter Stevie Wonder, featuring American rappers Rapsody, Chika, Cordae and Busta Rhymes. Released on October 13, 2020, it is a funk track with lyrics addressing institutional racism, and associated issues such as police brutality and the Black Lives Matter movement.

Released in a live-streamed press conference alongside "Where Is Our Love Song", this is Stevie Wonder's first single since "Faith" in 2016, and since he announced a temporary hiatus from performing in 2019 in order to undergo a kidney transplant. In addition, this is the first music he has not released through Motown, marking the end to his career-long association with the record label in favour of his new label, So What the Fuss Music, distributed through Republic Records. Both labels are currently part of the Universal Music Group.

Calling it "a response to systemic racism", Wonder said the song speaks in a time where "Not just Black people or people of colour but young people everywhere are going, 'This is not acceptable.' Change is right now". Busta Rhymes rap references the aftermath of the murder of George Floyd and the killing of Breonna Taylor.

Personnel 
 Stevie Wonder – main artist, lyrics, vocals, keyboards, harmonica, choir arranger, composer, producer
 Busta Rhymes – featured artist
 Rapsody – featured artist
 Cordae – featured artist
 Chika – featured artist
 Allison Semmes – backing vocals
 Camille Grigsby – backing vocals
 Cory Rooney – backing vocals
 George Young – backing vocals
 Kimberly Brewer – backing vocals
 Phylicia Hill – backing vocals
 Traci Nelson – backing vocals
 Will Wheaton – backing vocals
 Nathan Watts – bass
 Munyungo Jackson – percussion
 Stanley Randolph – drums
 Lamar Mitchell – programming
 Femi Jiya – recording
 Cristian F. Perez – engineering
 Neal Pogue – mixing
 David Avetisian – assistant mixing
 Mike Bozzi – mastering

References 

2020 singles
2020 songs
Black Lives Matter art
Stevie Wonder songs
Songs about George Floyd
Songs about police brutality
Songs against racism and xenophobia
Songs written by Stevie Wonder
Busta Rhymes songs
Republic Records singles
Universal Music Group singles
Song recordings produced by Stevie Wonder